Gunfire is the discharge of a firearm, or the sound made by this discharge.

Gunfire may also refer to:
 Gunfire (drink), a cocktail made of tea and rum
 Gunfire (character), a DC comic book superhero
 Gunfire (1934 film), a 1934 Western starring Rex Bell
 Gunfire (film), a 1950 American film directed by William Berke